Pataxó (Patashó), or Pataxó Hã-Ha-Hãe (Pataxó-Hãhaãi), is an extinct Maxakalían language of Brazil formerly spoken by the Pataxó people of the Bahia region, and of Minas Gerais, Pôsto Paraguassu in Itabuna municipality. The 2,950 individuals in the Pataxó tribe now speak Portuguese instead, though they retain a few Pataxó words, as well as some words from neighbouring peoples.

History of documentation
In 1961, a Pataxó speaker named Tšitši'a was recorded by Wilbur Pickering in Posto Caramurú (located 3 kilometers from Itaju, Bahia). Tšitši'a was married to a Baenã woman, but she could not speak the Baenã language. Pataxó people were also reported to be living in Itagüira, Itabuna, Bahia.

Distribution
Pataxó as documented by Prince Maximilian of Wied-Neuwied during the early 1800s is distinct from Pataxó-Hãhãhãe. It was historically spoken from the Mucuri River to Porto Seguro in southern Bahia from at least the 17th century.

From at least the 19th century, the Pataxó-Hãhãhãe had historically occupied a region stretching from the Pardo River to the de Contas River in southern Bahia.

Phonology

Vowels 

/ɨ, ɨ̃/ can also be heard as [ɪ, ɪ̃].

Consonants

References

Extinct languages of South America
Maxakalían languages
Languages extinct in the 2000s
Indigenous languages of Northeastern Brazil